Robert Hosie (8 September 1858 – 29 September 1932) was an Australian cricketer. He played one first-class cricket match for Victoria in 1884.

See also
 List of Victoria first-class cricketers

References

External links
 

1858 births
1932 deaths
Australian cricketers
Victoria cricketers
Cricketers from Melbourne